St Paul's tram stop is a tram stop serving nearby St Paul's Square, Birmingham, England. It was opened on 31 May 1999 on the Midland Metro Line 1. The stop is a short distance west of Birmingham Snow Hill station, which is visible from the stop. Pedestrian access is via Constitution Hill.

The stop sits in the shadow of Livery Street, which, at this point, is on a blue-brick lined embankment, preventing direct access to the square. Livery street then crosses the tram and railway lines, at a very acute angle, at the Wolverhampton end of the stop.

The Birmingham to Worcester railway line runs alongside, but the stop is served only by trams, as there are no railway platforms.

Services
Mondays to Fridays, Midland Metro services in each direction between Edgbaston and Wolverhampton run at six to eight-minute intervals during the day, and at fifteen-minute intervals during the evenings and on Sundays. They run at eight minute intervals on Saturdays.

References 

 Maps for 
 St. Paul's at Midland Metro
 Rail Around Birmingham

West Midlands Metro stops
Transport in Birmingham, West Midlands
Railway stations in Great Britain opened in 1999